Elsanor is an unincorporated community in Baldwin County, Alabama, United States.

History
The community is named for Elsa Norton, whose husband donated the land and money for the community's school.

References

Unincorporated communities in Baldwin County, Alabama
Unincorporated communities in Alabama